James Gresham may refer to:

James Gresham (poet), 17th-century English poet
James Gresham (MP), 17th-century English Member of Parliament for Haslemere
James Gresham (footballer), English footballer active in the 1890s
James Bethel Gresham (1893–1917), American serviceman killed in World War I
Jimmy Gresham (born 1934), singer and writer

See also
James Gresham Barrett, American politician